Laurindo Guizzardi C.S. (July 7, 1934 – February 22, 2021) was a Brazilian Roman Catholic prelate.

Guizzardi was born in Nova Bassano, Rio Grande do Sul, and was ordained to the priesthood in 1959. He served as bishop of the Roman Catholic Diocese of Bagé from 1982 to 2001 and as bishop of the Roman Catholic Diocese of Foz do Iguaçu from 2001 to 2010.

References

1934 births
2021 deaths
20th-century Roman Catholic bishops in Brazil
21st-century Roman Catholic bishops in Brazil
People from Rio Grande do Sul
Scalabrinians
Roman Catholic bishops of Bagé
Roman Catholic bishops of Foz do Iguaçu